Larry Lee Householder (born June 6, 1959) is an American politician  who was the state representative for Ohio's 72nd district and was a two-time Speaker of the Ohio House of Representatives. He is a member of the Republican Party. Householder represented the same district from 1997 to 2004, including as speaker from 2001 to 2004. In 2016, he was elected to the Statehouse again, and on January 7, 2019, he was selected to serve again as speaker. His district included Coshocton and Perry counties, as well as about half of Licking County.

On July 21, 2020, the FBI arrested Householder on federal RICO charges. The charges allege that his return to politics in 2016 was part of a criminal conspiracy. The Ohio House of Representatives unanimously removed Householder as speaker on July 30. In November 2020, Householder won reelection to his seat in the Ohio House of Representatives, but he was expelled from the House on June 16, 2021. Householder was convicted of racketeering after a jury trial.

Early life and education
Born in Zanesville, Ohio, Householder was raised in Junction City, Ohio, where he worked on his family's farm. He then attended Ohio University, earning a degree in political science. He is married with five children.

Career 
Householder ran an insurance agency and served as Perry County commissioner before seeking higher office.

Ohio House of Representatives

1997–2004 
In 1996, he ran for Ohio's 78th House district, challenging incumbent Democrat Mary Abel of Athens. Householder defeated Abel with 55.03% of the vote. He was reelected three times.

In 1998, Householder was elected to serve as assistant majority whip. In 2001, he was elected to serve as Speaker of the Ohio House of Representatives, the highest post in the House. He served two terms as speaker, during which he led major legislative reforms, including introducing concealed carry, passing tort reform and defunding Planned Parenthood—making Ohio the first state to do so.

In 2004, Householder and several top advisers were investigated for alleged money laundering and irregular campaign practices. The government closed the case without filing charges. He was term-limited in 2004. Householder was later elected the Perry County Auditor.

2017–2021
When incumbent state Representative Bill Hayes ran for Licking County prosecutor in 2016, Householder ran for his old seat, renamed District 72 after redistricting. Householder defeated Cliff N. Biggers in the Republican primary with almost 64% of the vote. He won the general election against Democrat John Carlisle with 72% of the vote. A former Speaker, Householder became a freshman legislator along with former President of the Ohio Senate Keith Faber. On January 7, 2019, a bipartisan majority of legislators elected him to serve again as speaker of the Ohio House.

Library programming controversy

In May 2019, Householder criticized the Ohio Library Council and the Newark Library in Licking County for providing an event for teens in the LGBTQ community at the taxpayers' expense. In response, the Newark Ohio Pride Coalition issued a formal statement noting that their organization paid for the event with a non-governmental grant. Later that evening, the Newark Library canceled the event. The Newark Ohio Pride Coalition found a new location for it.

After his arrest for racketeering in 2020, the event organizers publicly asked Householder to reflect upon his own advice about being a good steward of public money.

Arrest 

On July 21, 2020, the FBI arrested Householder and four others in connection with a $60 million bribery case involving the financial rescue of First Energy's two nuclear plants in Ohio, Davis–Besse and Perry. U.S. Attorney David M. DeVillers called it "likely the largest bribery scheme ever perpetrated against the state of Ohio". During a July 21 press briefing, DeVillers said that money from First Energy was filtered through a fake nonprofit organization to pay for bribes and evade campaign finance laws.

Following DeVillers's press conference, Republican Governor Mike DeWine asked Householder to resign. Later that day, Householder released a statement to the press saying he would not resign.

On July 30, 2020, the Ohio House of Representatives voted unanimously to remove Householder as Ohio House Speaker .

On June 16, 2021 the House voted to expel Householder by a bipartisan vote of 75–21.

On March 9, 2023, Householder was convicted of racketeering in relation to the First Energy scheme.

Personal life

References

External links
Ohio State Representative Larry Householder official site

|-

|-

|-

|-

1959 births
21st-century American politicians
County auditors in the United States
County commissioners in Ohio
Living people
Ohio University alumni
People expelled from United States state legislatures
People from Perry County, Ohio
Speakers of the Ohio House of Representatives
Republican Party members of the Ohio House of Representatives